The United People Alliance (Portuguese: Aliança Povo Unido or APU) was an electoral and political coalition between the Portuguese Communist Party (PCP) and the Portuguese Democratic Movement (MDP-CDE). After 1983, the Ecologist Party "The Greens" also joined.

The coalition was formed in 1978 in order to run for the next legislative election and split up after the breakaway and implosion of the MDP-CDE in 1987. After that, the PCP started to run in coalition with the Ecologist Party "The Greens" in the Democratic Unity Coalition.

Electoral results achieved by APU

Assembly of the Republic

Local elections

Portuguese Communist Party
1978 establishments in Portugal
1987 disestablishments in Portugal
Defunct left-wing political party alliances
Defunct political party alliances in Portugal